Cho Hyun-Doo is a football player from South Korea. He is currently coaching Suwon Samsung Bluewings youth system.

He was a member of the South Korean Youth (U-20) team in early 1990s and went on to play as a professional in the K-League.

He also made three appearances for the South Korea national team, including a match versus New Zealand in 1997.

Club career 
1996-2002 Suwon Samsung Bluewings
2003 Chunnam Dragons
2003-2005 Bucheon SK
2006-2007 Gangneung City
2009–2010 Yongin Citizen

External links
 
 
 

1973 births
Living people
Association football forwards
South Korean footballers
South Korea international footballers
Suwon Samsung Bluewings players
Jeonnam Dragons players
Jeju United FC players
Gangneung City FC players
K League 1 players
Korea National League players
K3 League players
Hanyang University alumni